Malins Lee railway station was a station in Malinslee, Shropshire, England. The station was opened in 1862 and closed in 1952. The station site marks the start of the Silkin Way footpath which follows the railway alignment as far as just short of the former Coalport East railway station.

References

Further reading

Disused railway stations in Shropshire
Railway stations in Great Britain opened in 1862
Railway stations in Great Britain closed in 1917
Railway stations in Great Britain opened in 1919
Railway stations in Great Britain closed in 1952
Former London and North Western Railway stations